Satta cannibalorum is a species of spiders in the family Lycosidae. It was first described in 1979 by Lehtinen & Hippa. , it is the only species in the genus Satta. It is found in New Guinea.

References

Lycosidae
Spiders of Asia
Spiders described in 1979
Taxa named by Pekka T. Lehtinen